Gibberula evandroi is a species of sea snail, a marine gastropod mollusk, in the family Cystiscidae.

Distribution
This species occurs in Cape Verde.

References

evandroi
Gastropods described in 2018